The Xian MA700 (MA for 新舟, "Modern Ark") is a twin-engine, medium-range turboprop airliner currently under development by Xi'an Aircraft Industrial Corporation of the Aviation Industry Corporation of China (AVIC).

Development 

When the aircraft was first announced in 2007, it was presented as a 70-seat aircraft. However, when a model of the aircraft was shown at the 2008 Zhuhai Airshow, it was touted as capable of offering about 80 seats in 4-abreast configuration.
Preliminary design was reviewed in January 2017, before detailed design.

Okay Airways and Joy Air were announced as launch customers for the aircraft and to be involved with its development, which had been  due to make its maiden flight in November 2019.
By late 2017 there were 185 orders for the 86-seat aircraft with purchase agreements with 11 customers including Joy Air, Okay Airways and Cambodia Bayon Airlines. The first prototype had been due to be assembled in 2017, with a maiden flight in 2019 and certification scheduled for 2021.  AVIC plans to apply for airworthiness certification with the United States' Federal Aviation Administration and the European Aviation Safety Agency so the plane can enter the Western market.

Long-lead items like flap and cargo door structures started to be built from December 2017.
In December 2017, Dowty Propellers was selected for a R408 propeller derivative.
Manufacturing of its flaps and cargo door had begun in Xian and Shenyang, respectively.
In January 2018, AVIC said structural and strength tests allowed to release wing flaps and forward fuselage technical specifications.
Maiden flight is targeted for November 2019, and Chinese certification by 2021 before introduction.
The first was to be rolled out around the middle of 2019 and first delivered in 2022.
While detailed design was to be completed by April 2018, the program slipped three years since its launch at the end of 2013, and Avic has not yet built a reputation for dependable products.

Design of major assemblies like the fuselage sections and wingboxes was sent to factories in late May 2018, to be constructed by the end of the year.
Structural design was finalized by June 2018 while 25-26 systems critical design reviews were completed.
Others should be completed by August and systems should be delivered from October for integrated system testing.
Technical manuals will be written in the second half of 2018.

The first MA700 was to be rolled out in June 2019 before a few months of ground tests including taxi runs.
The PW150C should get certification by 2019 end. 
Avic expects the EASA and FAA to validate the CAAC certification, anticipated for 2021 after 24 months of flight testing.
Avic sibling Comac needed six years for the ARJ21 and the C919 may need at least four years.

In July, Avic selected Rockwell Collins, Thales, Meggitt and Parker Hannifin as suppliers at the Farnborough Airshow.
By then, the CAAC had completed its review of the structure digital model, as the first prototype's fin, doors, undercarriage and nacelles 
were to begin construction.
The engine, avionics, propellers, APU and electrical system should be reviewed before the end of 2018.
Major assemblies should be sent for final assembly at Xian in the first half of 2019.
Avic develops the MA700 mostly from its own resources.
By December, the first centre wing box was completed for the static test aircraft towards a mid-2019 roll-out and 2022 service entry.

By June 2019, large fuselage parts were finished while the wings debuted assembly, before main components delivery and final assembly by the end of the year and static testing.
By July, the forward fuselage was completed after the main and nose fuselage sections.
By then, the first roll-out slipped by three months to September.
The nose, forward, and main fuselage sections were joined by 18 July.
The fuselage was mated with the wings by the end of September.

Xian Aircraft Company (Xi'an Yanliang) is now planned to be equipped with domestic Chinese engines, after the Canadian government withheld an export licence for the Pratt & Whitney Canada PW150C powerplant, Flightglobal has reported. The Canadian engine manufacturer has confirmed that the export licence, for which it had applied in 2018, was denied in 2020 due to political pressure from United States to hinder China's development.

Design 

The MA700 is conventional configuration, with a straight, tapered wing mounted high on the mid-fuselage, two tractor engines and a T-tail. The tricycle main landing gear are carried on faired pods outside the pressure vessel. The 2008 model was equipped with 6-bladed slightly swept propellers and showed 28 passenger windows per side.

The MA700 is an all-new design, larger than its competitors with 78 seats at 79 cm (31 in) pitch compared to 74 in the Q400 and 68 in the ATR 72, and stretch  potential for 90.

Its  cruise speed is faster than the originally expected  and the power installed to achieve fast climbs should let it attain its  maximum speed.
When it make its first flight, a 50-seat version similar to an ATR 42 should be developed for better high-elevation performance.
It would operate from 1,800 m (5,900 ft.) runways in high temperatures or snow, serving 95% of Chinese airports, excluding the highest in Tibet.

Orders and deliveries

As of June 2019, AVIC states 11 operators have ordered 285 aircraft.

Specifications (MA700)

See also

 ATR 72
 Bombardier Q-Series
 Ilyushin Il-114

References

External links
 
 

2000s Chinese airliners
MA700
Twin-turboprop tractor aircraft